Myron Tsosie is an American politician and a Democratic member of the Arizona House of Representatives representing District 6 since January 9, 2023. He previously represented District 7 from 2019 to 2023. Tsosie was elected in 2018 to succeed retiring State Representative Eric Descheenie. Tsosie is a member of the Navajo Nation.

Tsosie graduated from Northern Arizona University, and was serving on the Chinle Unified School District's Governing Board prior to his election as State Representative.

References

Year of birth missing (living people)
Living people
Democratic Party members of the Arizona House of Representatives
21st-century American politicians
Native American state legislators in Arizona
Northern Arizona University alumni